Golestaneh may refer to:
Golestaneh, Isfahan
Golestaneh, Kashan, Isfahan Province
Golestaneh, Kurdistan
Golestaneh, Delfan, Lorestan Province
Golestaneh, Rumeshkhan, Lorestan Province
Golestaneh, West Azerbaijan
Golestaneh, Zanjan